Grif Italia, or just Grif, is an Italian aircraft manufacturer based in Castel Sant'Elia. The company specializes in hang gliders and wings for ultralight trikes.

The company was founded in 1989 by hang glider pilot and instructor Italo Graziani. The company's motto is "Passion Into Innovation".

Aircraft

See also

List of Italian companies

References

External links

Hang gliders
Ultralight trikes
Aircraft manufacturers of Italy
Companies established in 1989
Italian companies established in 1989